Summit Lake is located east of Cameron Lake in Waterton Lakes National Park Alberta, Canada along the Alderson-Carthew trail.
It lies in the pass between Mount Carthew and Mount Custer.

References

Summit Lake